Rustenburg Commando was a light infantry regiment of the South African Army. It formed part of the South African Army Infantry Formation as well as the South African Territorial Reserve.

History

Origin
This commando was mustered in the Anglo Boer War Period.

Operations

With the Zuid Afrikaanse Republiek

Anglo Boer War
This Commando engaged in operations served at:
 Kimberley, 
 Siege of Mafeking, 
 Bechuanaland destroying a railway line,
 Kraaipan, 
 Vaalkrans and 
 Pieters Hill.

With the UDF
By 1902 all Commando remnants were under British military control and disarmed.

By 1912, however previous Commando members could join shooting associations.

By 1940, such commandos were under control of the National Reserve of Volunteers.

These commandos were formally reactivated by 1948.

1914 Rebellion
During the Maritz Rebellion, members served on both the side of the government and the insurrection.

World War 1
Commando members served in German South West Africa.

With the SADF
During this era, the unit was mainly involved in area force protection, cordones and search operations assisting the local police and stock theft control.

The unit resorted under the command of Group 19.

Colours
The unit received its colours on 20 August 1982 from the then vice State President, Mr A.L. Schlebush.

These colours were eventually laid up at the museum at Infantry School in Oudtshoorn in 2007.

With the SANDF

Disbandment
This unit, along with all other Commando units was disbanded after a decision by South African President Thabo Mbeki to disband all Commando Units. The Commando system was phased out between 2003 and 2008 "because of the role it played in the apartheid era", according to the Minister of Safety and Security Charles Nqakula.

Unit Insignia

Leadership 

 Commandant P.S. Steenkamp 1900
 Lt Col Gerhard Malan 2005

References

See also 
 South African Commando System

Infantry regiments of South Africa
South African Commando Units